Leucoscypha is a genus of fungi in the family Pyronemataceae.

Species
 Leucoscypha alpestris (Sommerf.) Eckblad, 1968
 Leucoscypha erminea (E. Bommer & M. Rousseau) Boud., 1907
 Leucoscypha fossulae (Limm. ex Cooke) Boud., 1907
 Leucoscypha leucotricha (Alb. & Schwein.) Boud., 1907
 Leucoscypha ricciae (P. Crouan & H. Crouan) Dennis, 1971

References

Pyronemataceae
Pezizales genera
Taxa described in 1885
Taxa named by Jean Louis Émile Boudier